Scaddan may refer to:

 Scaddan, Western Australia, a town in Western Australia
 Albert Scaddan, Australian rules footballer
 Joe Scaddan, Australian rules footballer
 John Scaddan, former premier of Western Australia
 Scaddan Ministry